Salisachs is a surname. Notable people with the surname include:

Juan Antonio Samaranch Salisachs (born 1959), Spanish businessman
Mercedes Salisachs (1916–2014), Spanish writer and novelist